Underbelly is a live events producer and venue operator, known as one of the "Big Four" venue operators at the Edinburgh Festival Fringe. From its roots as a Fringe venue, the company has expanded to include a festival on London's South Bank and seasonal events in Edinburgh and elsewhere. Despite their success they often refuse to pay their suppliers and ignore all attempts to make contact.

History

Edinburgh
Underbelly was founded in 2000 by directors Ed Bartlam and Charlie Wood to operate one venue at the Edinburgh Festival Fringe. In 2001, Underbelly Limited was formed to turn the Underbelly venue into a professional operation. The original venue, on Edinburgh's Cowgate, now includes a number of different performance spaces, with themed names such as Iron Belly, White Belly and Big Belly. Over the years, Underbelly's operations have expanded beyond the Cowgate, to include a hub space known as the Udderbelly pasture in George Square and a Circus Hub on The Meadows, as well as a hub in Bristo Square. Each Underbelly venue is recognisable by its purple, cow-themed branding, most notably a large, upside-down, inflatable purple cow which serves as one of the venues. In 2015, Underbelly hosted over 130 shows at the Fringe.

For many years, Underbelly also co-ordinated "Edinburgh's Christmas" - a funfair, market and events programme in the eastern section of Princes Street Gardens, but stopped in 2022.

Other locations
In 2009, in collaboration with the Southbank Centre in London, the company launched Udderbelly Festival, an eight-week programme of comedy, circus and family entertainment inside the upside-down purple cow venue. By 2015, the festival had extended to fifteen weeks. The festival won Best Festival at the London Lifestyle Awards in 2012.

In 2012, Underbelly also launched London Wonderground, a programme of circus, cabaret and family entertainment, based in a 1920s Paradiso Spiegeltent. The Wonderground also presents oddities, curiosities and eccentricities such as the 60-metre high Star Flyer which gives views over London's rooftops.

Other London events which Underbelly has produced include West End Live in Trafalgar Square, Pride in London (2014–18), and the Rekorderlig Cider Lodge at Southbank Centre's Winter Festival. In 2015, Underbelly produced the official Fanzone at the Rugby Union World Cup in Richmond.

Elsewhere, the company produced the Comedy Hullabaloo in Stratford-Upon-Avon (2013–15) and the Udderbelly Festival in Hong Kong.

Criticisms

2019 Christmas Market

In December 2019, Underbelly came under scrutiny for acquiring the East Princes Street Gardens without planning permission.
The markets were marked by safety concerns that were kept secret by the City of Edinburgh Council and for the subsequent damage done to the gardens from their operations, that also included criticism over handling of memorial benches moved to make way for the market. An investigation into the £150,000 damage to the gardens caused by the market has been launched.

In response, Edinburgh council agreed to consider moving the markets, and launched an internal investigation into whether correct processes were followed in granting a two-year contract extension to the operator.

Further criticism has arisen after the longstanding tradition of the Loony Dook, held annually on the morning of January 1 every year, became a ticketed event which quickly sold out. Underbelly has been criticised for profiteering from a public tradition, as well as raising the price of tickets for profit.

2019 Hogmany
Underbelly, in collaboration with Edinburgh city council, came under criticism in 2019 for restrictions on residents during Edinburgh's Hogmanay celebration. The company restricted access to residents and limited the number of guests they could invite by providing a limited number of "residents' passes" per household. The company was also accused of passing on resident's details to police for 'security checks'. The claims were disputed by councillors, who stated the arrangements were "just the same as they have been in previous years".

Labour party Member of the Scottish Parliament for Lothian, Sarah Boyack, said that it "should not be up to a private company to decide how many people they can have in their homes" and warned that it impacted private family events.

Labour conditions

During the 2017, 2018 and 2019 Edinburgh festival, and the 2017, 2018 and 2019 Hogmanay celebrations, Underbelly have been criticised for exploitation and mistreatment of its staff, with accusations of underpayment and non-payment, poor accommodation for its staff, and poor management. In the 2018 Fringe Festival, Underbelly were criticised for unfair labour practices in the course of the Fair Fringe campaign to ensure the companies paid the minimum wage, observed legal limits on working hours and did not use unpaid volunteers.

Performers
Performers who have appeared at Underbelly venues since 2000 include:

Comedians

Stewart Lee
Waen Shepherd
Will Adamsdale aka Chris John Jackson in Jackson's Way
Rob Deering
Lucy Porter
Janey Godley
Rain Pryor
Robin Ince 
Russell Howard
Howard Read
Paul Provenza  
Ricky Tomlinson
Topping & Butch
Richard Herring 
Simon Bird
Reginald D Hunter
Phil Nicol
Joan Rivers
Frisky and Mannish

Musicians

Keane
The Thrills
Athlete
Nizlopi 
Oasis
Ocean Colour Scene 
Tom Jones
Mark Owen (of Take That)
Tina Dico (who collaborated with Zero 7)
Gwyneth Herbert

References

External links
Underbelly official website
Official Edinburgh Fringe website

Edinburgh Festival Fringe
Edinburgh Comedy Festival
Companies based in the London Borough of Camden